Cyclophora glomerata is a moth in the  family Geometridae. It is found in New Guinea and on Seram, Borneo and Sulawesi.

Subspecies
Cyclophora glomerata glomerata (New Guinea, Seram, Borneo)
Cyclophora glomerata collusa (Prout, 1938) (Sulawesi)

References

Moths described in 1903
Cyclophora (moth)
Moths of Asia